Franco Misael Fagúndez Rosa (born 19 July 2000) is a Uruguayan professional footballer who plays as a forward for Nacional.

Career
Fagúndez is a former youth academy player of Montevideo Wanderers and Danubio. In January 2020, he joined Nacional and initially started to play with club's reserve team. He made his professional debut for Nacional on 19 November 2021 in a 1–0 league win against Cerrito. On 13 March 2022, he scored his first goal for the club in a 1–1 draw against Montevideo City Torque.

Career statistics

Honours
Nacional
Uruguayan Primera División: 2022

Individual
 Uruguayan Primera División Team of the Year: 2022

References

External links
 

2000 births
Living people
Footballers from Montevideo
Association football forwards
Uruguayan footballers
Uruguayan Primera División players
Club Nacional de Football players